= Adam Khan Kili =

Adam Khan Kili عدم خان کلی
- Location within Pakistan
- Coordinates: 32.33°N 70.12°E
- Country: Pakistan
- Territory: Federally Administered Tribal Areas
- Elevation: 677 m (2,221 ft)
- Time zone: UTC+5 (PST)
  - Summer (DST): UTC+6 (PDT)

Adam Khan Kili (Urdu: عدم خان کلی) is a town in the Federally Administered Tribal Areas of Pakistan. It is located at 32°19'55N 70°7'30E with an altitude of 677 metres (2224 feet).
